Brendon Gale (born 18 July 1968) is a former Australian rules footballer who played for the Richmond Football Club in the Australian Football League (AFL).

After his AFL playing career, Gale practiced law with commercial law firm King Wood Mallesons, until serving as chief executive officer of the AFL Players' Association from 2005 to 2009. He was also a member of the AFL's "Laws of the Game" or Rules Committee. On 10 August 2009, he was appointed CEO of Richmond.

Playing career
Gale played for the Richmond Football Club from 1990 to 2001 as a centre half-forward and later ruckman.  For five seasons he played alongside his older brother, Michael, who was a very skilled football player some may say even amazing, who transferred from the Fitzroy Football Club at the end of the 1993 season. Michael was also a very skilled pianist and flutist.  Brendon was appointed vice-captain of the club between 1994 and 1997. Their father, Don Gale, was a champion Tasmanian footballer who became the first player from the NWFU to achieve All Australian selection.  Their grandfather, Jack Gale, played three games for Richmond in 1924.

For a period during his playing days Gale played guitar in a small band called Trial By Video, which included other footballers Mark Zanotti, Tony Woods, and Paul Bulluss.

Statistics

|- style="background-color: #EAEAEA"
! scope="row" style="text-align:center" | 1990
|
| 25 || 22 || 21 || 22 || 150 || 75 || 225 || 100 || 24 || 14 || 1.0 || 1.0 || 6.8 || 3.4 || 10.2 || 4.5 || 1.1 || 0.6
|- 
! scope="row" style="text-align:center" | 1991
|
| 25 || 21 || 16 || 15 || 159 || 104 || 263 || 118 || 16 || 39 || 0.8 || 0.7 || 7.6 || 5.0 || 12.5 || 5.6 || 0.8 || 1.9
|- style="background-color: #EAEAEA"
! scope="row" style="text-align:center" | 1992
|
| 25 || 18 || 7 || 9 || 162 || 112 || 274 || 103 || 15 || 51 || 0.4 || 0.5 || 9.0 || 6.2 || 15.2 || 5.7 || 0.8 || 2.8
|- 
! scope="row" style="text-align:center" | 1993
|
| 25 || 16 || 26 || 21 || 162 || 91 || 253 || 134 || 10 || 64 || 1.6 || 1.3 || 10.1 || 5.7 || 15.8 || 8.4 || 0.6 || 4.0
|- style="background-color: #EAEAEA"
! scope="row" style="text-align:center" | 1994
|
| 25 || 21 || 27 || 24 || 191 || 101 || 292 || 144 || 14 || 62 || 1.3 || 1.1 || 9.1 || 4.8 || 13.9 || 6.9 || 0.7 || 3.0
|- 
! scope="row" style="text-align:center" | 1995
|
| 25 || 24 || 30 || 15 || 210 || 95 || 305 || 133 || 28 || 117 || 1.3 || 0.6 || 8.8 || 4.0 || 12.7 || 5.5 || 1.2 || 4.9
|- style="background-color: #EAEAEA"
! scope="row" style="text-align:center" | 1996
|
| 25 || 22 || 34 || 25 || 178 || 88 || 266 || 129 || 20 || 42 || 1.5 || 1.1 || 8.1 || 4.0 || 12.1 || 5.9 || 0.9 || 1.9
|- 
! scope="row" style="text-align:center" | 1997
|
| 25 || 19 || 12 || 8 || 168 || 93 || 261 || 102 || 26 || 206 || 0.6 || 0.4 || 8.8 || 4.9 || 13.7 || 5.4 || 1.4 || 10.8
|- style="background-color: #EAEAEA"
! scope="row" style="text-align:center" | 1998
|
| 25 || 21 || 4 || 1 || 191 || 144 || 335 || 128 || 22 || 393 || 0.2 || 0.0 || 9.1 || 6.9 || 16.0 || 6.1 || 1.0 || 18.7
|- 
! scope="row" style="text-align:center" | 1999
|
| 25 || 18 || 6 || 3 || 137 || 77 || 214 || 93 || 17 || 297 || 0.3 || 0.2 || 7.6 || 4.3 || 11.9 || 5.2 || 0.9 || 16.5
|- style="background-color: #EAEAEA"
! scope="row" style="text-align:center" | 2000
|
| 25 || 20 || 22 || 3 || 165 || 86 || 251 || 107 || 15 || 239 || 1.1 || 0.2 || 8.3 || 4.3 || 12.6 || 5.4 || 0.8 || 12.0
|- 
! scope="row" style="text-align:center" | 2001
|
| 25 || 22 || 4 || 1 || 102 || 149 || 251 || 92 || 24 || 308 || 0.2 || 0.0 || 4.6 || 6.8 || 11.4 || 4.2 || 1.1 || 14.0
|- class="sortbottom"
! colspan=3| Career
! 244
! 209
! 147
! 1975
! 1215
! 3190
! 1383
! 231
! 1832
! 0.9
! 0.6
! 8.1
! 5.0
! 13.1
! 5.7
! 0.9
! 7.5
|}

References

Bibliography
 Hogan P: The Tigers of Old, Richmond FC, Melbourne 1996

External links

 

1968 births
Living people
VFL/AFL administrators
Australian chief executives
Richmond Football Club administrators
Richmond Football Club players
Burnie Hawks Football Club players
Sandy Bay Football Club players
Allies State of Origin players
Tasmanian State of Origin players
Australian rules footballers from Tasmania
Tasmanian Football Hall of Fame inductees